Charles Stimson may be:
Charles Stimson (lawyer), born 1963, Defense Department official
Charles D. Stimson (businessman), 1857-1929, lumber businessman